Royal Jet LLC, typically referred to as RoyalJet, is an airline based in Abu Dhabi, United Arab Emirates. It is a charter operator aimed at the luxury market between the UAE and Europe. RoyalJet has operating bases at Abu Dhabi International Airport, Al Bateen Executive Airport, and Al Maktoum International Airport.

History 
The airline started operations on 4 May 2003 as a joint venture by Abu Dhabi Aviation and Abu Dhabi Amiri Flight (since 2009, Presidential Flight).

In 2021, RoyalJet Bermuda, a wholly-owned subsidiary of RoyalJet, was launched, flying a single Boeing 737-700 BBJ.

Fleet
 

The RoyalJet fleet consists of the following aircraft:

References

External links

Airlines of the United Arab Emirates
Airlines established in 2003
Emirati companies established in 2003